Hugh McLean (born 20 January 1952) is a Scottish former footballer who played for West Bromwich Albion, Swindon Town and Dumbarton.

References

External links

1952 births
Scottish footballers
Dumbarton F.C. players
Scottish Football League players
Living people
People from Stornoway
English Football League players
West Bromwich Albion F.C. players
Swindon Town F.C. players
Association football midfielders
Sportspeople from Scottish islands